The Dave Pinkney Trophy is awarded to the goaltenders of the Ontario Hockey League team that has the lowest goals against average. It has been awarded annually since 1949.

Winners
List of winners of the Dave Pinkney Trophy.

See also
 List of Canadian Hockey League awards

References

External links
 Ontario Hockey League

Ontario Hockey League trophies and awards
Awards established in 1949